Home Blitz is an alternative rock band founded by Daniel DiMaggio in 2005. Based in Princeton, New Jersey, the group is known for its idiosyncratic punk-influenced pop music.

Musical history
Daniel DiMaggio, frontman and songwriter for Home Blitz since 2005, is known for what Pitchfork described as "genre-ambivalent" low-fidelity power pop with eccentricities that "flaunt his oblique streak like a point of pride" and "compel repeated listening."

, the band included frontman Daniel DiMaggio, drummer Henry Hynes, bass player Jason Sigal, and guitarist Theresa Smith.

According to the Mexican Summer label, DiMaggio's approach to songwriting changes on each new record, with the result that no two Home Blitz releases sound alike. Common threads include lo-fi recordings featuring DiMaggio's lead vocals, and "the sort of nervous energy that powered groups like the Feelies and Game Theory, two distinct touchpoints in Home Blitz's sloppy, floppy sound."

The 2012 EP Frozen Track includes five original songs by DiMaggio and a "reverent" cover of Game Theory's "Rolling With The Moody Girls."

DiMaggio recorded the 2015 album, Foremost & Fair,  in a professional studio, unlike the band's previous material, resulting in clearer vocals and higher fidelity. According to Vice, the album features "a noticeable UK folk influence creeping into the muscular guitar pop DiMaggio has become known for."

Pitchfork wrote that DiMaggio "spikes saccharine melodies with bratty little gestures, rebelling against his own compositional knowhow." The reviewer described DiMaggio's breathy and "unapologetically affected" vocals, layered over a mix "saturated with shimmery tones: teeming harpsichord, zippy keyboard, sunburst acoustic guitar picking."

Discography

Albums

Singles and EPs

References

External links
 
 
 

Alternative rock groups from New Jersey
Musical groups established in 2005